Brisbane Hockey Association (BHA) is the governing body for the sport of men's hockey in Brisbane, Australia. It is responsible for the administration of men's and boy's competitions, representative teams, officials and the financial position of the sport.
It's located in the Queensland State Hockey Centre in Colmslie, a suburb south of Brisbane.

Clubs 
The following clubs compete in the Brisbane Hockey Association
 Bulimba Hockey Club
 Commercial Hockey Club
 Eastern Suburbs Hockey Club
 Kedron Wavell Services Hockey Club
 Labrador Hockey Club
 Northern Suburbs Hockey Club
 Pine Hills Hockey Club
 Pine Rivers St Andrews Hockey Club
 Queensland Police Hockey Club
 QUT Hockey Club
 Redcliffe Leagues Hockey Club
 Southbank Strikers Hockey Club
 South West United Hockey Club
 University of Queensland Hockey Club
 Valley Hockey Club

References

External links 
 Official Website

Field hockey governing bodies in Australia
Sports governing bodies in Queensland
Sport in Brisbane